Florensky may refer to:

Florensky (crater), a lunar crater

People with the surname
Pavel Alexandrovich Florensky (1882–1937), Russian Orthodox theologian, philosopher, mathematician and electrical engineer.  
Kirill Pavlovich Florensky (1915–1982), Russian geologist, son of Pavel Florensky.